"A Song for Europe" is the fifth episode of the second series of the Channel 4 sitcom Father Ted and the 11th episode overall. It originally aired on April 5, 1996 and has since been recognised as one of the most popular episodes of the show.

The episode is based on Ireland's winning streak at the Eurovision Song Contest during the 1990s. The plot centres around Ted and Dougal trying to write a song for it (though the episode does not refer to that name directly) in order to settle a rivalry with Dick Byrne. The pair unsuccessfully write their own tune, before deciding to steal a former entry they believe nobody remembers. This backfires and they have to play the original tuneless song, but controversially win the Irish selection contest anyway. The music was composed by Neil Hannon and was performed by Hannon and Darren Allison from The Divine Comedy.

Synopsis

The episode begins when Dougal has "Eurosong fever", weeks ahead of the competition. After initially rejecting Dougal's suggestion that they write a song to represent Ireland in the competition on the grounds that they are not skilled in songwriting, Ted discovers his nemesis Dick Byrne does have plans to enter a song. Ted decides that if Dick Byrne can write a song, he and Dougal can write a better one. After working all night, they come up with "My Lovely Horse", a tuneless dirge with ridiculous lyrics lasting less than a minute. After trying the song out on Mrs Doyle and Father Jack, Jack is so infuriated he shoots Ted's guitar. Disillusioned, they are about to give up when Ted discovers the lyrics fit a tune by "Nin Huugen and the Huugen Notes", an obscure B-side for an entry from the fifth-placed act in Norway's Eurosong preselection from 1976. Ted thinks that because the whole band died in a plane crash, including all the record company staff and everyone involved in the copyright, they will get away with stealing it.

At the Dublin theatre where "A Song for Ireland" is being hosted, Ted has some trouble talking to the show's producer Charles Hedges (who is deciding the winning entry) as he finds he is gay. Ted and Dougal listen to Dick Byrne's entry, "The Miracle Is Mine". It is extremely impressive, with a full choir, huge band and a passionate performance from Byrne. Ted is worried and goes backstage for a smoke, where he hears the Norwegian tune first being whistled by a maintenance worker, then playing in a lift. He is horrified, realising that the song is more well-known than he thought, and he and Dougal are forced to adopt "Plan B": singing the dreadful original version. In the original version, Ted even says near the end when changing chord for the only time during the song, "Hang on, I can do this bit", while Dougal uses what looks like an old Casio keyboard.

However, despite their poor performance, and against the obvious wishes of the audience, Hedges selects "My Lovely Horse" as Ireland's entry, nervously laughing off Byrne's suggestion that he wants to guarantee Ireland lose the main competition, with it being too expensive to host the competition every year, Ireland having won the last five Eurosongs. (Ireland won the real Eurovision Song Contest in 1992, 1993 and 1994, and so had the costly obligation of hosting it in 1993, 1994 and 1995.) The episode closes at the Eurosong contest, with Ted, Dougal, Jack and Mrs. Doyle listening to every country awarding them "nul points".

Production

Jack does not have a single line in this episode, though he does have a memorable moment when he reacts to the initial performance of "My Lovely Horse" by blasting Ted's guitar to pieces with a sawn-off shotgun.

Steve Coogan was intended to play compère Fred Rickwood, but could not make it, so Irish comic Jon Kenny stepped in. Kenny had appeared in Father Ted previously, as Michael the cinema owner in "The Passion of St Tibulus".

The music in the episode is written and, in the case of "Nin Huugen and the Huugen Notes", performed by Neil Hannon who also wrote and recorded the title music. The band name is a clumsy pun on "Huguenots".

Declan Lowney, who directed most Father Ted episodes, was also director of the 1988 Eurovision Song Contest.

The actual name of the Eurovision Song Contest is not mentioned at any point in the episode. The reference is always to the "Eurosong Competition".

Cultural references

The scene in which Ted loses his temper at Dougal's failure to play the correct note is a reference to "The Troggs Tapes", a notorious out-take from a recording session by The Troggs. In the Father Ted script book, Graham Linehan notes that he initially wanted the scene to run longer, but that it was ultimately cut down to just long enough for people familiar with the out-take to get the reference.

Ted mentions Icy-Tea and Scoopy Scoopy Dog Dog meaning Ice-T and Snoop Doggy Dogg.

The tragic story of Nin Huugen and the Huugen Notes' deaths in a plane crash could be a reference to similar events with past musician artists such as "The Day the Music Died" (deaths of Buddy Holly, Ritchie Valens and The Big Bopper) and the loss of multiple members of Lynyrd Skynyrd in the 1977 Convair CV-240 crash.

Ted mentions that there was a priest named Father Benny Cake who scored a Number 1 hit single in England – after changing his name so nobody would know he was a priest – with a song titled "Vienna". This joke references Midge Ure of Ultravox, although in reality "Vienna" was famously kept off the British Number 1 spot by Joe Dolce's "Shaddap You Face", and Midge Ure has no connection to the priesthood. The song did reach No. 1 in Ireland, where the series is set.

A Song for Ireland 1996

The entries for "Song for Ireland 1996" were: (only songs 1 & 2 are shown being performed; the names of 3 to 6 are seen on a sign)
 "The Miracle is Mine" by Fr. Dick Byrne and Fr. Cyril McDuff
 "My Lovely Horse" by Fr. Ted Crilly and Fr. Dougal McGuire (winner)
 "If I Could Wear My Hat Like My Heart" by The Grand Girls
 "You Dirty English Bastards" by The Hairy Bowsies
 "The Drums of Africa Are Calling Me Home" by Sean O'Brien
 "Sha la la la la la la la la la la la la" by Death Pigs

The Hairy Bowsies are a real band featuring Paul Woodfull (aka Paul Wonderful), a comedian friend of Graham Linehan and Arthur Mathews. Their songs are traditional Irish ballads, with republican lyrics.

Inspiration

It has been widely claimed that this episode was inspired by real events surrounding Ireland's selection of its entry for the 1994 Eurovision Song Contest.
Faced with the daunting (and financially crippling) task of hosting its third consecutive Eurovision, RTÉ were said to have chosen an inferior quality song (Paul Harrington & Charlie McGettigan's "Rock 'n' Roll Kids") over vastly superior ones in order to prevent the possibility of an unwanted third victory. In the event, "Rock 'n' Roll Kids" not only won the contest but also became the highest scoring song in Eurovision history up to that point.

A month after this episode was first broadcast, Ireland won the 1996 Eurovision Song Contest to secure the country's fourth victory in five years.  Coincidentally enough, the Norwegian broadcaster NRK branded the 1996 contest as "Eurosong 96" in its logo.

"My Lovely Horse"

The song was written by Graham Linehan, Arthur Mathews and Neil Hannon (of The Divine Comedy).

According to the writer's commentary, the video for "My Lovely Horse" was based on a 1975 lifestyle video for "That's What Friends are For" by The Swarbriggs, which was Ireland's entry for the 1975 Eurovision Song Contest, which they consider the funniest music video of all time. Some of the shots are even copied down to every last detail.
The song goes:

My lovely lovely lovely horse.

My lovely horse (my lovely horse),
Running through the field (running through the field).

Where are you going,
With your fetlocks blowing
In the wind?

I want to shower you with sugarlumps.
And ride you over fences.
Polish your hooves every single day.
And bring you to the horse dentist.

My lovely lovely lovely horse.

My lovely horse (my lovely horse),
You’re a pony no more (you’re a pony no more).
Running around, with a man on your back,
like a train in the night...

Like a train in the night.     (saxophone solo)

The song, which lasts 1:23, was produced by Darren Allison and Neil Hannon during sessions for The Divine Comedy's Casanova album. It was released on CD as a B-side to the band's 1999 single "Gin Soaked Boy".

The climax of the clip features the sudden appearance of the horse's head to the cacophonous wail of a saxophone, surrounded by a typically 1970s-disco-style burst of multi-coloured lights. Dougal and Ted wake up in horror simultaneously, with Ted panting "We have to lose that sax solo!"

The outdoor sequences were shot in the grounds of the Falls Hotel in Ennistymon, County Clare, Ireland. In the background the cascade waterfall in Ennistymon can clearly be seen.

Legacy
The episode is often regarded as one of the most popular, appearing on the Best Of video, with one of the most memorable moments being the video for "My Lovely Horse".

In May 2014 a petition to make "My Lovely Horse" Ireland’s entry for Eurovision 2015 was formally submitted to the government, but was rejected by the Oireachtas petitions committee.

References

External links

 
 My Lovely Horse video clip by Channel 4 on YouTube

1996 British television episodes
Eurovision Song Contest 1996
Father Ted episodes
Musical television episodes